Bernard Schreiner (16 August 1937 – 24 March 2020), was a French politician.

Schreiner was born in Brumath, Bas-Rhin. He fought in the Algerian War and was decorated with the Croix de la Valeur Militaire.

He was elected as a representative on 16 June 2002 for the XIIth legislature (2002–2007), representing the Bas-Rhin district. He was a member of the Union for a Popular Movement (UMP) party.

Schreiner died on 24 March 2020.

Offices

03/25/1977 – 03/13/1983: Mayor of Brumath (Bas-Rhin)
03/14/1983 – 03/19/1989: Mayor of Brumath (Bas-Rhin)
03/16/1986 – 01/31/1989: Member of the Regional Counsel of Alsace
06/18/1988 – 04/01/1993: Legislator
01/03/1988 – 03/27/1994: Member of the General Counsel of Bas-Rhin
03/20/1989 – 06/18/1995: Mayor of Brumath (Bas-Rhin)
04/02/1993 – 04/21/1997: Legislator
03/28/1994 – 03/18/2001: Member of the General Counsel of Bas-Rhin
06/19/1995 – 03/18/2001: Mayor of Brumath (Bas-Rhin)
06/01/1997 – 06/18/2002: Legislator

As of 16 June 2002:
Member of the General Counsel of Bas-Rhin

References

1937 births
2020 deaths
People from Bas-Rhin
Rally for the Republic politicians
Union for a Popular Movement politicians
Mayors of places in Grand Est
French military personnel of the Algerian War
Recipients of the Order of the Cross of Terra Mariana, 2nd Class
Recipients of the Cross for Military Valour
Deputies of the 12th National Assembly of the French Fifth Republic